José Luis Moreno Peña (born 22 October 1996) is a Colombian footballer.

Career

In 2015, Moreno was sent on loan to the reserves of Spanish La Liga side Valencia from Once Caldas in the Colombian top flight.

For the 2020 season, he signed for Paraguayan club River Plate Asunción.

References

External links
 José Luis Moreno at Soccerway

Colombian footballers
Living people
Association football defenders
1996 births
Sportspeople from Valle del Cauca Department
Once Caldas footballers
Valencia CF Mestalla footballers
Millonarios F.C. players
River Plate (Asunción) footballers